Guarnieri is an Italian surname. Notable people with the surname include:

Adriano Guarnieri (1914–1983), Italian alpine skier
Adriano Guarnieri (composer) (born 1947), Italian classical composer
Adriano Guarnieri (born 1979), Eye doctor and researcher
Albert Guarnieri (1899–1980), American football player
Albina Guarnieri (born 1953), Italian-born Canadian politician
Anna Maria Guarnieri (born 1933), Italian actress
Antonio Guarnieri (1880–1952), Italian classical cellist and conductor
Camargo Guarnieri (1907–1993), Brazilian composer
Danilo Caro Guarnieri (born 1965), Colombian trap shooter
Ennio Guarnieri (1930–2019), Italian cinematographer
Gianfrancesco Guarnieri (1934–2006), Brazilian actor, lyricist, poet and playwright
Giuseppe Guarnieri (1856–1918), Italian physician
Jacopo Guarnieri (born 1987), Italian cyclist
Johnny Guarnieri (1917–1985), American musician
Luiz Carlos Guarnieri (born 1971), Brazilian footballer
Rodolfo Guarnieri (born 1927), Argentine former sports shooter
Umberto Guarnieri (born 1919), Italian footballer

See also
Guarneri, family of luthiers from Cremona

Italian-language surnames